Shalmali Kholgade is an Indian playback singer, who predominantly sings for Hindi language films. In addition to Hindi, she has also sung in other Indian languages such as Marathi, Bengali, Telugu and Tamil. Through her singing career, she has received one Filmfare Award from two nominations, and has been praised for her singing style.

Personal life 
She married Farhan Shaikh, a mixing and mastering engineer, on 22 November 2021.

Music career

Career beginning (2004–2011) 
Shalmali began performing at the age of 16 and has had her tutelage in music from the age of 8 years under her mother, Uma Kholgade – an Indian classical singer and theatre personality. She later continued her music education under Shubhada Paradkar and has also recently been accepted by the Los Angeles College of Music for their April semester but decided not to attend, due to her recording commitments. Shalmali paid a two-hour tribute to one of her favorite singers; Amy Winehouse last year at Blue Frog, Mumbai which was attended widely. She is also a vocalist with Mikey McCleary's popular act 'The Bartender' where she has performed beautiful renditions of vintage Bollywood songs revamping it with a flavour of sensuous, old school jazz, and is featured on their second album, 'B Seventy'. Furthering her versatility as a performer, Shalmali has performed as a soloist with a Latvian troupe in a Cabaret named Bombaloo which toured Moscow, Yerevan and Armenia. She has been singing professionally in Mumbai for several years, and worked as a backing vocalist for Ali Zafar's songs.

Singing debut in films & breakthrough (2012–present)

Shalmali made her debut as a lead vocalist in Bollywood playback singing in 2012 with the song "Pareshaan" from film Ishaqzaade under the music of Amit Trivedi. The song was a critical and commercial success, topping charts across India. For Pareshaan Kholgade won the Filmfare Award for Best Female Playback Singer among several other awards.

Her other two songs in 2012, "Daaru Desi" from Cocktail, and "Aga Bai" from Aiyyaa, both became hits. In 2013, Kholgade's first track, "Lat Lag Gayee" from the movie Race 2 met with immense commercial appreciation. The song remained on the top of the charts for many weeks and became hugely popular in dance clubs. Kholgade received further critical and commercial success with the track "Balam Pichkari" from the movie Yeh Jawaani Hai Deewani.  For the song, Kholgade received many nominations including her second Filmfare Award for Best Female Playback Singer nomination. She also sang the title track for Shuddh Desi Romance, "Besharmi Ki Height" and "Shanivar Raati" for Main Tera Hero, "D Se Dance" for Humpty Sharma Ki Dulhania and " Shayarana" for Daawat-E-Ishq, which got her more critical appreciation. She also received praise for the song "Baby Ko Bass Pasand Hai" from the sports drama Sultan (2016).She received critical acclaim for her singing style in a series of hit songs, including "Aga Bai" from Aiyyaa (2012),"Chingam Chabake" from Gori Tere Pyaar Mein (2013),"Mohobbat Buri Bemari" from Bombay Velvet (2015), "Shakira" from Welcome to Karachi (2015), and "Naach Meri Jaan" from ABCD 2 (2015), all of which topped the charts.

Kholgade's first regional song "Raja Raja" from the 2013 Tamil film Naan Rajavaga Pogiren was well received. Her song "Oday Oday" from the romantic film Raja Rani was successful in the Southern part of India, and made her an accomplished singer in the South Indian film Industry. She followed this success with further regional hits, "Kala Koi Geli" for the Bengali film Proloy (2013), "Preminchaa" for the Telugu film Toofan (2013), "Maria" from the Bengali film Herogiri (2015), "Jil Jil Jil" for the Telugu film Jil (2015), "Tu Mila" for the Marathi film Timepass 2 (2015), and "Kangaroo" from the Marathi film Highway (2015). In addition to these, she was also one of the judges of the Sony Entertainment Television's reality show Indian Idol Junior for auditions. She also judging the show Sur Nava Dhyas Nava which was aired on Colors Marathi. 

Kholgade has released a hit single "Kalle Kalle" on the Valentine's Day of 2020 which celebrates singledom.

Kholgade will make her debut as a music composer with the Marathi film June, set to release in 2020.

Acting career
Shalmali made her film debut with a supporting role in the 2009 Ranjan Singh's  East Indian Konkani-Marathi film Tu Maza Jeev, which was released on Maharashtra Day. The film was a moderate success at the Box Office India and earned mixed reviews, however, she was praised for her performance.

Discography

Non-film songs

Awards and nominations

See also
 List of Indian playback singers

References

External links

 

Year of birth missing (living people)
Living people
Singers from Mumbai
Marathi playback singers
Tamil playback singers
Kannada playback singers
Bengali playback singers
Telugu playback singers
Bollywood playback singers
Indian women singer-songwriters
Indian singer-songwriters
Marathi people
Filmfare Awards winners
21st-century Indian singers
21st-century Indian women singers
Women musicians from Maharashtra
Screen Awards winners